is a tactical role playing game developed by Idea Factory and released for the PlayStation 2 in 2005. The PSP port was published in the U.S. by NIS America, and in Europe by Ghostlight under the title Spectral Souls: Resurrection of the Ethereal Empires.

Development
The opening song is "Blue Sky", performed by Dogschool. It is now sold in the Apple App store. Later on, this game was ported to Android and iOS devices. 
The iOS port solves the problem of the extreme long loading time issue from the PSP port.

Reception
The PSP version was criticized for its long load times. It received "generally unfavorable" reviews according to the review aggregation website Metacritic.

References

External links
 Spectral Souls Resurrection of the Ethereal Empires Official website for Mobile version Android/iOS
The official North American English website
The official European website
Windows Store page

2005 video games
PlayStation Portable games
Android (operating system) games
IOS games
Tactical role-playing video games
Video games developed in Japan
Windows games
Windows Phone games
Idea Factory games
Single-player video games
Nippon Ichi Software games
Ghostlight games